Eulepidotis microleuca is a moth of the family Erebidae first described by Harrison Gray Dyar Jr. in 1914. It is found in the Neotropics, including the Brazilian state of Rio de Janeiro.

References

Moths described in 1914
microleuca